Sára Cholnoky (born November 3, 1988) is a Hungarian sailor. She placed 23rd in the women's RS:X event at the 2016 Summer Olympics.

References

External links
 
 
 
 

1988 births
Living people
Hungarian female sailors (sport)
Olympic sailors of Hungary
Sailors at the 2016 Summer Olympics – RS:X
Sailors at the 2020 Summer Olympics – RS:X
Hungarian windsurfers
Female windsurfers